Etched in Blue is the first solo album by John Schumann, which appeared in 1987, the year after he left the folk rock band, Redgum. It was reissued on CD in 2009. At the APRA Music Awards of 1989, Schumann won Most Performed Australasian Country Work for the lead track, "Borrowed Ground".

Album artwork
The cover art shows Schumann's face and a map in the background.

Track listing
"Borrowed Ground" - 4:24
"Thunder Across The Reef" - 4:35
"Holy Mary" - 5:28
"Coming Home" - 3:48
"Safe Behind The Wire" - 3:28
"He's Got The Money" - 4:02
"Yuppy Days" - 4:39
"After The Party" - 3:52
"For The Children" - 4:12
"Borrowed Ground Reprise 1788-1988" - 4:15

Charts

References

External links
 The Redgum Lyrics Archive - Etched in Blue

1987 debut albums
John Schumann albums
CBS Records albums